Proline-rich protein 16 (PRR16) is a protein coding gene in Homo sapiens. The protein is known by the alias Largen.

Gene

Locus 
PRR16 is located on the long arm of chromosome 5. It is found at position 5q23.1. It has five known transcripts.

Gene Neighborhood 
Cytogenic band: 5q23.1

The image above shows chromosome five and the various gene locations on it. PRR16 can be seen at the thin red band that has been placed at q23.

Size 
PRR16 spans 330,365 bases and encodes for a mRNA that is 1,707 nucleotides. The resulting protein is 304 amino acids long.

mRNA

Splice Variants 
PRR16 has five known splice variants, each with a different processed transcript.

Isoforms 
There are three known isoforms of PRR16. Isoform 2 contains an additional exon in the 5' region, and it thus differs in the 5' UTR and initiates translation at an alternate start codon, compared to variant 1. Isoform 3 has two variants. The first contains an alternate 5' terminal exon, and it thus differs in the 5' UTR and initiates translation at a downstream in-frame start codon, compared to variant 1. The second contains alternate 5' exon structure, and it thus differs in the 5' UTR and initiates translation at a downstream in-frame start codon, compared to variant 1. All three isoforms are shorter at the N-terminus, compared to isoform 1.

Protein

Structure

Primary Structure 
The PRR16 protein is 304 amino acids in length. It has a molecular weight of 32.8 kDa and an isoelectric point of 8.09. The protein does not interact with the membrane.

Secondary Structure 

The only predictable feature of the PRR16 protein is an α-helix near the N-terminus, spanning about thirty amino acids. The remainder of the protein has a disordered structure.

Tertiary Structure 
This structure was predicted by analyzing the amino acid sequence using I-TASSER. The final result can be seen below.

Post-Translational Modifications 

 Predicted glycation at Lys 4, Lys 6, Lys 49, Lys 94, Lys 96, Lys 105, Lys 119, Lys 148, Lys 181, and Lys 290.
 Predicted nuclear export signals (NES) at Leu 39 and Leu 41.
 Predicted O-linked glycosylation sites at Ser 2, Ser 5, Ser 10, Ser 11, Ser 12, Ser 75, Thr 79, Ser 82, Ser 83, Ser 84, Ser 85, Ser 87, Thr 88, Ser 91, Ser 111, Thr 130, Thr 143, Thr 149, Glu 235, Leu 254, Ser 270, Ser 272, Ser 274, Thr 282, Thr 287, Thr 294, Ser 299, and Thr 300.
 Predicted phosphorylation at Ser 2, Ser 5, Ser 10, Ser 11, Ser 22, Ser 74, Ser 75, Ser 82, Ser 83, Ser 84, Ser 85, Ser 87, Ser 91, Thr 115, Thr 130, Thr 152, Tyr 224, Thr 254, Thr 282, Ser 299, Thr 300, and Thr 303.
 Predicted sumoylation at site Lys 133.

Subcellular Location 
The k-NN tool suggests the location of PRR16 in the nucleus of the cell with 52.2% certainty. The cytoplasm was predicted with 30.4% certainty, The following locations were predicted with 4.3% certainty: cytoskeleton, plasma membrane, mitochondria, and peroxisome.

Expression 
The PRR16 gene is expressed at very low levels throughout the body. It is expressed in the skeletal muscle, heart, lung, skin, portions of the brain, and bone marrow.

Interacting Proteins

Homology

Paralogs 

There are two isoforms of Inhibitory synaptic factor 1 that are known paralogs of PRR16.

Orthologs 
PRR16 is found in all classes of vertebrates, including mammals, birds, fish, reptiles and amphibians. The most distant ortholog of PRR16 is in Branchiostoma belcheri and Branchiostoma floridae, which diverged an estimated 684 million years ago. The gene has not been found in any plants, fungi or single celled organisms. The table below compares the known orthologs.

References 

Attribution: Contains public domain text from https://www.ncbi.nlm.nih.gov/gene/51334

Human proteins
Genes on human chromosome 5